Kennebec is a town in and county seat of Lyman County, South Dakota, United States. The population was 281 at the 2020 census.

History
Kennebec was laid out in 1905. Kennebec has served as county seat of Lyman County since 1922. The courthouse dates from 1925.

Transportation
The highways that run in or near Kennebec are east-west Interstate 90 (I‑90) and South Dakota Highway 273 (SD 273), which is a north-south highway.

The one main transportation for Kennebec is by road (I‑90 and SD 273), as there is no airport, municipal or commercial. There are no trains for passengers but the Ringneck & Western Railroad provides freight service to the Wheat Growers' Kennebec Elevator.

Geography
Kennebec is located at  (43.904284, -99.862801).

Kennebec has been assigned the ZIP code 57544 and the FIPS place code 33580.
Kennebec is located in section of agricultural use area in Kennebec Township. Medicine Creek is about one eighth of a mile south of Kennebec. 

Climate

Demographics

2010 census
As of the census of 2010, there were 240 people, 112 households, and 69 families residing in the town. The racial makeup of the town was 90.0% White, 6.7% Native American, and 3.3% from two or more races.

There were 112 households, of which 23.2% had children under the age of 18 living with them, 50.9% were married couples living together, 7.1% had a female householder with no husband present, 3.6% had a male householder with no wife present, and 38.4% were non-families. 33.9% of all households were made up of individuals, and 17.9% had someone living alone who was 65 years of age or older. The average household size was 2.14 and the average family size was 2.72.

The median age in the town was 45.6 years. 22.5% of residents were under the age of 18; 5% were between the ages of 18 and 24; 20.8% were from 25 to 44; 25.4% were from 45 to 64; and 26.3% were 65 years of age or older. The gender makeup of the town was 51.7% male and 48.3% female.

2000 census
As of the census of 2000, there were 286 people, 120 households, and 80 families residing in the town. The population density was 336.9 people per square mile (129.9/km2). There were 152 housing units at an average density of 179.1 per square mile (69.0/km2). The racial makeup of the town was 88.46% White, 6.64% Native American, 1.05% Asian, and 3.85% from two or more races. Hispanic or Latino of any race were 0.70% of the population.

There were 120 households, out of which 24.2% had children under the age of 18 living with them, 55.8% were married couples living together, 4.2% had a female householder with no husband present, and 33.3% were non-families. 30.0% of all households were made up of individuals, and 18.3% had someone living alone who was 65 years of age or older. The average household size was 2.38 and the average family size was 3.01.

In the town, the population was spread out, with 24.8% under the age of 18, 4.2% from 18 to 24, 25.2% from 25 to 44, 25.5% from 45 to 64, and 20.3% who were 65 years of age or older. The median age was 44 years. For every 100 females, there were 110.3 males. For every 100 females age 18 and over, there were 104.8 males.

The median income for a household in the town was $36,875, and the median income for a family was $50,000. Males had a median income of $26,161 versus $17,813 for females. The per capita income for the town was $20,815. About 3.9% of families and 8.1% of the population were below the poverty line, including 6.1% of those under the age of eighteen and 5.2% of those 65 or over.

Notable people
 James Abdnor, South Dakota politician who was United States Senator from 1981 to 1987 and was administrator of the Small Business Administration from 1987 to 1989
 James Schaefer, South Dakota state legislator and rancher
 Merrill Q. Sharpe, Governor of South Dakota

See also
 List of towns in South Dakota

References

External links

Towns in Lyman County, South Dakota
Towns in South Dakota
County seats in South Dakota
Populated places established in 1905
1905 establishments in South Dakota